Lake Quannapowitt is a lake in Wakefield, Massachusetts. It is one of two large lakes in Wakefield, the other being the man-made Crystal Lake.  The lake is named for Quonopohit, the Naumkeag Native American who signed a deed to the town that would become Wakefield in 1686. Given its easily accessible location off Route 128 in Middlesex County, Lake Quannapowitt is a popular setting for walkers, joggers, bikers, and in-line skaters. It is the site of many organized races from 5Ks to ultramarathons. Since 1992, Friends of Lake Quannapowitt (FOLQ) has operated as an organization working to fulfill its goal of promoting public awareness and providing long-term protection and enhancement of Lake Quannapowitt and its environs. Large amounts of tar were found in the lake some years ago. The lake is emptied by the Saugus River.

Lake Quannapowitt (KWAN-ah-POW-it / KWAN-ə-POW-it), which was originally known as Reading Pond, has numerous nicknames today. Some area natives refer to the lake as "Lake Quannapolluted" due to their view of the state of health of the lake, but the Massachusetts Department of Environmental Protection handled only one isolated open case of contamination from the electric company that was remediated in 2008. The two former beaches remain closed to swimming, due to arsenic which was introduced into the lake in the early 1960s to handle aquatic weeds.

The town common of Wakefield abuts the southeastern shore of the lake. A well-known scene in the town is of its iconic bandstand on the town common, with Lake Quannapowitt in the background.

The lake has active populations of warm-water species of fish.

References

External links
 Friends of Lake Quannapowitt official website
 Lake Quannapowitt at VisitingNewEngland.com
 An overview of a 2006 ultramarathon around the Lake, archived at the Wayback Machine

See also 
 Wakefield, Massachusetts

Quannapowitt
Wakefield, Massachusetts
Quannapowitt